José Alirio Contreras Vásquez (born  March 21, 1978) is a Venezuelan professional racing cyclist.

Career
2005
 3rd in General Classification Vuelta a Santa Cruz de Mora (VEN)
 1st in Mountains Classification Vuelta a Venezuela (VEN)
2006
 3rd in General Classification Vuelta al Tachira (VEN)
2009
 7th in General Classification Vuelta a Venezuela (VEN)

External links

1978 births
Living people
Venezuelan male cyclists
Place of birth missing (living people)
Competitors at the 2006 Central American and Caribbean Games